Galore is the debut studio album by Canadian electronic music band Dragonette, released on August 6, 2007 by Mercury Records. The album contains a mix of newly recorded tracks and reworked songs which had featured on their independently released Dragonette EP, which was available through the band's website two years earlier.

Release
Anticipation for the album was increased early in 2007 when Popjustice published a "Greatest Hits of 2007" list including four of the album's tracks: "I Get Around", "True Believer", "Marvellous" and "Competition". While "I Get Around" and "Take It Like a Man" were both released as proper singles, music videos for "Competition" and "Jesus Doesn't Love Me" were filmed and released online.

Galore was first released digitally in the United Kingdom and the United States in August 2007. A physical release followed in the UK and Canada in September 2007, and in the US in November 2008.

Track listing

Personnel
Credits adapted from the liner notes of Galore.

Dragonette
 Dragonette – production
 Martina Sorbara – vocals ; keyboards 
 Dan Kurtz – bass, keyboards, programming ; backing vocals ; guitar ; electric guitar 
 Joel Stouffer – drums ; keyboards ; percussion 
 Will Stapleton – guitar ; acoustic guitar 
 Simon Craig – guitar 

Additional personnel

 Richard Andrews – art direction, design
 Dave Arch – piano 
 Iyiola Babalola – production 
 Simon Craig – guitar
 Davide Direnzo – drums 
 Sandrine Dulermo – photography
 Andy Duncan – drum programming 
 Tracey Fox – management
 Future Cut – additional programming 
 Dan Grech-Marguerat – mixing ; vocal recording 
 Neil Harris – management
 Ted Jensen – mastering
 Junkie XL – keyboards, production, programming 
 Greg Kurstin – production ; keyboards, programming 

 Michael Labica – photography
 Darren Lewis – production 
 Scott MacLachlan – A&R
 Danny Michel – acoustic guitar 
 David Naughton – additional Pro Tools 
 Steve Power – production 
 Pete Prilesnik – Pro Tools, string programming 
 Eric Ratz – drum recording 
 Tim Roe – additional Pro Tools, drum editing 
 Vince Spilchuk – keyboards 
 Graeme Stewart – drum recording ; drum programming 
 Matt Vaughan – keyboard programming 
 Adam White – additional Pro Tools

Charts

Release history

References

2007 debut albums
Albums produced by Greg Kurstin
Dragonette albums
Mercury Records albums
Universal Music Canada albums